Academy of Korean Studies (한국학중앙연구원, AKS) is a South Korean research and educational institute with the purpose of establishing profound research on Korean culture. It was established on June 22, 1978, by Ministry of Education & Science Technology of South Korea (교육과학기술부). The Academy has dedicated  to interpreting and analyzing Korean culture in general, defining the academic identity of Korean studies, and educating scholars.

Korean Studies

Journal published by the Academy of Korean Studies
Korea Journal
Review of Korean Studies
Korean Studies Quarterly

Journals not published by the Academy of Korean Studies
Korean Studies, Hawaii
The Journal of Korean Studies, Seattle
Encyclopedia of Korean Culture
Acta Koreana

See also
List of national universities in South Korea
List of universities and colleges in South Korea
Education in Korea

References

External links
 The official site in Korean
 The official site in English
  Introducing research institutes at the Korean HIstory On-line (한국역사정보통합시스템)

Korean studies
Bundang
1978 establishments in South Korea
Universities and colleges in Gyeonggi Province
Research institutes in South Korea
Social science institutes
Educational institutions established in 1978